Bendick may refer to:

People
Marc Bendick Jr., American economist 
Robert Bendick, American television producer

Places
Bendick Murrell, town in New South Wales, Australia

Surnames from given names